This is a list of prefects of Dubrovnik-Neretva County.

Prefects of Dubrovnik-Neretva County (1993–present)

See also
Dubrovnik-Neretva County

Notes

External links
World Statesmen - Dubrovnik-Neretva County

Dubrovnik-Neretva County